Roman Bundz (born September 1, 1970 in Lviv, Ukrainian SSR) is a Ukrainian sprint canoer who competed from the mid-1990s to the early 2000s (decade). Competing in two Summer Olympics, he earned his best finish of seventh in the C-1 1000 m event at Atlanta in 1996.

References
Sports-Reference.com profile

1970 births
Sportspeople from Lviv
Canoeists at the 1996 Summer Olympics
Canoeists at the 2000 Summer Olympics
Living people
Olympic canoeists of Ukraine
Ukrainian male canoeists
Recipients of the Order of Merit (Ukraine), 3rd class